Plantago holosteum is an annual plant of the family Plantaginaceae and the genus Plantago.

Description
The flowering period extends from May to June.

Distribution and habitat
This species can be found in South-eastern Europe, especially in the Carpathian Mountains.

References

holosteum